Holy Trinity Church is in the village of Seathwaite, Cumbria, England. It is an active Anglican parish church in the deanery of Furness, the archdeaconry of Westmorland and Furness, and the diocese of Carlisle. Its benefice is united with those of four other local parishes. The church is recorded in the National Heritage List for England as a designated Grade II listed building.

History

The church was built in 1874 to a design by the Lancaster partnership of Paley and Austin. Holy Trinity was built on the site of an earlier church. For 67 years the curate of that church had been Robert Walker, who was made famous by the poet William Wordsworth. Wordsworth called him "Wonderful Walker", and made reference to him in his Duddon Sonnets and in the poem The Excursion. It was paid for mainly by the industrialist H. W. Schneider.

Architecture

Exterior
Holy Trinity is constructed in coursed slate rubble and has a slate roof. Its plan consists of a nave and chancel in one range, with an organ loft and vestry to the north, and a south porch. At the west end is a gabled bellcote. All the windows are lancets. There are wide buttresses externally between the nave and the chancel. A stone is attached to the porch incorporating a sundial; this had formerly been the shearing stool of Walker.

Interior
Inside the church is a stoup with a trefoil arcade. Painted on the wall of the chancel are the Ten Commandments. Also in the church is a brass. This had formerly been on a gravestone; it is to the memory of Walker, who died in 1802, and his wife, Anne, who had died two years previously. The stained glass, dating from 1897, is by Kempe. The two-manual organ was built in 1902 by Young.

See also

List of ecclesiastical works by Paley and Austin
Listed buildings in Dunnerdale-with-Seathwaite

References

External links
Cumbrian Churches
Visit Cumbria
(Note: Both websites show photographs of the church.)

Churches completed in 1874
19th-century Church of England church buildings
Gothic Revival church buildings in England
Gothic Revival architecture in Cumbria
Church of England church buildings in Cumbria
Grade II listed churches in Cumbria
Diocese of Carlisle
Paley and Austin buildings
South Lakeland District

de:Holy Trinity Church (Seathwaite)